Milan Standish Creighton (January 21, 1908 – May 16, 1998) was an American football player and coach. He was the head coach for the National Football League's Chicago Cardinals from 1935 to 1938. As the coach of the Cardinals, he compiled a record of 16–26–4 in four seasons and also played seven years for the team.

Prior to his professional career, Creighton played college football at the University of Arkansas, where he earned three letters in football between 1928 and 1930 and served as team captain for the Razorbacks football team in 1930. While also at Arkansas, he also earned three letter as a member of the Razorbacks basketball team between 1929 and 1931, and was a two-time All-Southwestern Conference honoree in 1930 and 1931. In 1931 he was Arkansas' only individual to earn All-Southwest Conference honors.

After leaving the NFL, Creighton coached high school football at Hot Springs High School, where he compiled a record of 44–16–4.

References

1908 births
1998 deaths
American football ends
American men's basketball players
Arkansas Razorbacks football players
Arkansas Razorbacks men's basketball players
Chicago Cardinals players
Chicago Cardinals head coaches
High school football coaches in Arkansas
People from Gothenburg, Nebraska
Players of American football from Nebraska